Pere Ariweriyai (born October 19, 1983 in Rivers State) is a Nigerian footballer who played in South Africa.

References

1983 births
Living people
Footballers from Rivers State
Nigerian footballers
Association football defenders
Platinum Stars F.C. players
AmaZulu F.C. players
Santos F.C. (South Africa) players
Nigerian expatriate footballers
Expatriate soccer players in South Africa
Nigerian expatriate sportspeople in South Africa
South African Premier Division players
National First Division players